Clifford (formerly New Glasgow) is an unincorporated community in Amherst County, Virginia, United States. Clifford has a post office with ZIP code 24533, which opened on March 23, 1883. Five sites in the vicinity of Clifford are listed on the National Register of Historic Places: Brick House, Clifford-New Glasgow Historic District, Geddes, Mountain View Farm, and Winton.

References

Unincorporated communities in Amherst County, Virginia